Killerbee 106.3 is a radio branding of Quest Broadcasting Inc. in the Philippines. It may refer to:

DYBE-FM, a radio station in Bacolod City
DXKM, a radio station in General Santos City